Huayllay District (Quechua Wayllay recreation meadow, lush grove, ichu variety) is one of thirteen districts of the province Pasco in Peru.

Geography 
Some of the highest mountains of the district are listed below:

See also
 Huayllay National Sanctuary
 Kuchpanqa
 Warunqucha
 Wat'aqucha
 Yanaqucha

References